The 1927 French Grand Prix (formally the XXI Grand Prix de l'A.C.F.) was a Grand Prix motor race held at Montlhèry on 3 July 1927. The race was held over 48 laps of a 12.50 km course for a total distance of 600.00 km and was won by Robert Benoist driving a Delage.

Background
The World Championship was carried out for the third time in 1927. The regulations remained more or less the same as in 1926 with minor changes reported for the 1927 World Championship. On October 27, 1926, the AIACR & CSI debated at their Paris meetings the regulations and announced for 1927  that the 1.5-liter formula would remain only until the end of 1927 because of the bad experiences made so far, to be relieved with the free formula for 1928. The minimum weight was increased from 600 to 700 kg. The supercharger was allowed  and the two-seat body remained for 1927, though single-seat bodied cars would be allowed as long as the body showed a minimum width of 80 cm to be measured at the seat area for a height of not less than 25 cm. The minimum distance for the great international races was now fixed at 600 km.

Classification

Fastest Lap: Robert Benoist, 5m41.0 (131.96 km/h)

Note - Starting grid based on car number order, positions being drawn. 3x3 formation.

References

External links

French Grand Prix
French Grand Prix
Grand Prix